Paralyzer is a first single from Finger Eleven's fifth album.

Paralyzer or paralyser may also refer to:

 Paralyser, that which causes paralysis (the complete loss of muscle function for one or more muscle groups)
 Paralyzer, the alias of Randall Darby, a fictional mutant character
 Paralyzer, a cocktail consisting of cola, milk, coffee liqueur, and vodka, variant of a Black Russian

See also
 Paralysed (disambiguation)
 Paralysis (disambiguation)